Kenig is a surname of Ashkenazi Jewish (Yiddish) origin, represents a variation of König. Notable people with the surname include:

Alejandro Kenig (born 1969), Argentine footballer
Ariel Kenig (born 1983), French writer
Jan Ignacy Kenig (1822–1880), Polish engineer
Maya Kenig, Israeli film director

Kenig or Kyonig is also the colloquial Russian name for Kaliningrad (formerly the German city of Königsberg, from which the nickname is derived)